Maurice De Groote (born 24 September 1908) was a Belgian gymnast. He competed in seven events at the 1952 Summer Olympics.

References

1908 births
Year of death missing
Belgian male artistic gymnasts
Olympic gymnasts of Belgium
Gymnasts at the 1952 Summer Olympics
Place of birth missing